This article lists some of the famous small chess tournaments in history.

Introduction
The list comprises only regular tournaments with three or four players (Triangular or Quadrangular).

The first international tournament with four players (two Spanish and two Italian) was held, at the invitation of King Philip II of Spain, at the Royal Court of Spain in Madrid in 1575.

Tournaments

 1575 Madrid 1. Giovanni Leonardo da Cutri, 2. Paolo Boi, 3. Ruy López de Segura, 4. Alfonso Ceron
 1821 Saint Cloud (Triangular) 1. Louis-Charles Mahé de La Bourdonnais, 2. Alexandre Deschapelles, 3. John Cochrane
 1855 London (Triangular) 1. Ernst Falkbeer, 2. Adolf Zytogorski, 3. Brien
 1865 Elberfeld 1. Gustav Neumann 2. Viktor Knorre 3. Hoeing 4. Pinedo
 1867 Cologne 1–2. Wilfried Paulsen, Conrad Vitzthum von Eckstaedt, 3–4. Ehrmann, Emil Schallopp
 1871 Krefeld (Triangular) 1. Louis Paulsen, 2. Adolf Anderssen, 3. Johannes Minckwitz
 1871 Wiesbaden 1. Carl Göring, 2. Adolf Stern, 3. Johannes Minckwitz, 4. Hermann von Hanneken
 1876 Düsseldorf 1. Wilfried Paulsen, 2–3. Ernst Flechsig, Constantin Schwede, 4. Asbeck
 1879 London 1. Henry Edward Bird 2–3. Joseph Henry Blackburne, James Mason, 4. George Alcock MacDonnell
 1883 Berlin 1. Hermann von Gottschall, 2. Emil Schallopp, 3. Max Harmonist, 4. Berthold Lasker
 1889 Berlin 1. Emil Schallopp, 2. Theodor von Scheve, 3. Horatio Caro, 4. Hülsen
 1892 Belfast 1–2. Joseph Henry Blackburne, James Mason, 3. Henry Bird, 4. Francis Joseph Lee
 1894 Buffalo 1. Jackson Showalter, 2. Harry Pillsbury, 3. Adolf Albin, 4. Farnsworth
 1895 Skaneateles 1. Eugene Delmar, 2. Richardson, 3. Albert Hodges, 4. Luce
 1895 Hastings 1. Géza Maróczy 2–3. Henry Ernest Atkins, Rudolf Loman, 4. Wilhelm Cohn
 1895/96 St. Petersburg 1. Emanuel Lasker, 2. Wilhelm Steinitz, 3. Harry Pillsbury, 4. Mikhail Chigorin
 1896 Vienna 1. Berthold Englisch, 2. Carl Schlechter, 3. Georg Marco, 4. Max Weiss
 1897 New York (Triangular) 1–2. Wilhelm Steinitz, Samuel Lipschütz, 3. William Ewart Napier
 1897 Altona 1. Johannes Metger, 2. Hugo Süchting, 3–4. Martin Bier, Julius Dimer
 1898 Budapest  1. Rudolf Charousek, 2. Géza Maróczy, 3. Győző Exner, 4. Arthur Havasi 
 1898 Elmshorn 1–4. Hugo Süchting, Martin Bier, Julius Dimer, Arved Heinrichsen
 1899 Budapest (Triangular) 1. Géza Maróczy, 2. Győző Exner, 3. Miklós Bródy
 1900 Munich 1–2. Carl Göring, Abraham Speijer, 3–4. Julius Dimer, Dirk Bleijkmans
 1900 Kiel 1–2. Hugo Süchting, Oskar Antze  3. Johannes Metger, 4. Hermes
 1901 Kiel 1–2. Hugo Süchting, Johannes Metger, 3. Oeltjen, 4. Julius Dimer
 1901 Paris 1–2. Stanislaus Sittenfeld, Adolf Albin, 3. Jean Taubenhaus, 4. Maurice Billecard
 1901 Craigside 1. Amos Burn, 2. Henry Ernest Atkins, 3. Gunston, 4. Bellingham
 1902 Paris 1. Dawid Janowski, 2. Jean Taubenhaus, 3. Theodor von Scheve, 4. Adolf Albin
 1902 Carlsbad (Triangular) 1. Viktor Tietz, 2. Dawid Janowski, Moritz Porges
 1902 Vienna 1. Leopold Löwy, Jr, 2. Augustin Neumann, 3. Julius Perlis, 4. Siegfried Reginald Wolf
 1902 Berlin 1. Ossip Bernstein, 2–3. Erich Cohn, Oskar Piotrowski,  4. Iosif Januschpolski
 1903 Hamburg 1. Hugo Süchting, 2. Carl Carls, 3. Johannes Metger, 4. Julius Dimer
 1904 Munich 1. Rudolf Spielmann, 2. Friedrich Köhnlein, 3. Moissei Eljaschoff, 4. Kürschner
 1904 Lemberg 1. Emil Gross, 2. Karol Irzykowski, 3. Ignatz von Popiel, 4. Kasimir de Weydlich
 1904 Sylvan Beach 1. Frank Marshall, 2. Howard, 3. Roething, 4. Guckemus
 1905 Hamburg 1. Rudolf Spielmann, 2. Julius Dimer, 3. Oeltjen, 4. Oskar Antze
 1905 Ostend 1. Georg Marco,  2–3. Frank Marshall, Paul Saladin Leonhardt, 4. Richard Teichmann
 1905 Łódź  (Triangular) 1–2. Akiba Rubinstein, Gersz Salwe, 3. Fedor Duz-Khotimirsky
 1906 Trenton Falls 1. Emanuel Lasker, 2. Curt, 3. Albert Fox, 4. Raubitschek
 1906 Łódź  1. Akiba Rubinstein, 2. Mikhail Chigorin, 3. Alexander Flamberg, 4. Gersz Salwe
 1906 St. Petersburg 1. Simon Alapin, 2. Mikhail Chigorin, 3. Evtifiev, 4. Eugene Znosko-Borovsky
 1906 Bremen 1–2. Wilhelm Hilse, Sohège, 3. Julius Dimer, 4. Oskar Antze
 1907 Hanover 1. Carl Carls, 2–3. Hugo Süchting, Albert Edelheim, 4. Wilhelm Hilse
 1907 Warsaw 1. Alexander Flamberg, 2. Salomon Langleben, 3. Lucian Einbild, 4. Jan Kleczyński Jr.
 1908 Łódź  (Triangular) 1. Akiba Rubinstein, 2. Frank Marshall, 3. Gersz Salwe
 1908 Warsaw 1. Simon Alapin, 2. Gersz Salwe, 3. Alexander Flamberg, 4. Salomon Langleben
 1908 St. Petersburg 1. Sergey Lebedev, 2. Sergey von Freymann, 3. Alexander Romanovsky, 4. Grigory Helbach
 1908 Trenton Falls 1. Clarence Howell, 2. Leon Rosen, 3. Sharp, 4. Eugene Delmar
 1909 Göteborg 1. Milan Vidmar, 2. Paul Saladin Leonhardt, 3. Oldřich Duras, 4. Sjøberg
 1909 Munich 1. Richard Teichmann, 2. Simon Alapin, 3. Rudolf Spielmann, 4. Dawid Przepiórka
 1909 Munich 1. Hans Fahrni, 2. Savielly Tartakower, 3–4. Simon Alapin, Rudolf Spielmann
 1911 Munich 1. Simon Alapin, 2. Rudolf Spielmann, 3. Solomon Rosenthal, 4. Hans Fahrni
 1911 Munich 1. Simon Alapin, 2. Gersz Rotlewi, 3. Rudolf Spielmann, 4. Hans Fahrni
 1911 Barmbek 1. Wilhelm Hilse, 2–3. Hugo Süchting, Julius Dimer, 4. Carl Carls
 1911 Kitzingen (Triangular) 1. Andreas Duhm, 2. Hrdina, 3. Friedrich Köhnlein
 1911 Amsterdam 1–2. Frank Marshall, Arnold van Foreest, 3. Adolf Georg Olland, 4. Johannes Esser
 1913 New York 1. Frank Marshall 2. Oldřich Duras, 3. Oscar Chajes, 4. Charles Jaffe
 1913 Warsaw (Triangular) 1. Alexander Flamberg, 2. Oldřich Duras, 3. Moishe Lowtzky
 1913 Łódź  1. Gersz Salwe, 2. Rosenbaum, 3. Gottesdiener, 4. Moshe Hirschbein
 1913 St. Petersburg 1–2. Alexander Alekhine, Grigory Levenfish, 3–4. Oldřich Duras, Eugene Znosko-Borovsky
 1914 Kiev 1. Alexander Evensohn, 2. Efim Bogoljubov, 3. Fedir Bohatyrchuk, 4. Nikolai Grekov
 1914 Paris 1–2. Frank Marshall, Alexander Alekhine, 3. André Muffang, 4. B. Hallegua
 1914 Berlin 1–2. Rudolf Spielmann, Erich Cohn, 3. Richard Teichmann, 4. Jacques Mieses
 1914 Vienna 1. Siegfried Reginald Wolf, 2. Ernst Grünfeld, 3. Sauer, 4. Willman
 1915 Vienna 1. Józef Dominik, 2–3. Josef Krejcik, Kalikst Morawski, 4. Richard Réti
 1915 Atlantic City (Triangular) 1. Frank Marshall, 2. Sharp, 3. Moorman
 1915/16 Triberg (Triangular) 1. Efim Bogoljubov, 2. Ilya Rabinovich, 3. Alexey Selezniev
 1916 Tampa 1. Moorman, 2–3. Jackson Whipps Showalter, Traube, 4. Hernandes
 1916 Budapest 1. Gyula Breyer, 2. Zoltán von Balla, 3. Richard Réti, 4. Johannes Esser
 1916/17 Vienna (Triangular) 1. Carl Schlechter, 2. Milan Vidmar, 3. Arthur Kaufmann
 1916/17 Łódź  1. Gersz Salwe, 2. Teodor Regedziński, 3. Samuel Factor, 4. Moshe Hirschbein
 1917 Triberg 1–2. Ilya Rabinovich, Alexey Selezniev, 3. Efim Bogoljubov, 4. Samuil Weinstein
 1917 Havana (Triangular) 1. Clarence Howell, 2. Juan Corzo, 3. Blanco
 1917 London (Triangular) 1. George Edward Wainwright, 2. Philip Sergeant, 3. Macdonald
 1917/18 Vienna 1. Milan Vidmar, 2. Savielly Tartakower, 3. Carl Schlechter, 4. Lajos Asztalos
 1918 Berlin 1. Milan Vidmar, 2. Carl Schlechter, 3. Jacques Mieses, 4. Akiba Rubinstein
 1918 Berlin 1. Emanuel Lasker, 2. Akiba Rubinstein, 3. Carl Schlechter, 4. Siegbert Tarrasch
 1918 Moscow (Triangular) 1. Alexander Alekhine, 2. Vladimir Nenarokov, 3. Abram Rabinovich
 1918 Amsterdam 1. Max Marchand, 2–3. van Gelder, Arnold van Foreest, 4. Abraham Speijer
 1918 Hertogenbosch 1–2. Jan Willem te Kolsté, Gerard Oskam, 3. Max Marchand, 4. Norden
 1919 Stockholm 1. Rudolf Spielmann, 2. Akiba Rubinstein, 3. Efim Bogoljubov, 4. Richard Réti
 1919 Berlin 1. Efim Bogoljubov, 2. Alexey Selezniev, 3–4. Rudolf Spielmann, Richard Réti
 1919 Berlin 1. Alexey Selezniev, 2. Efim Bogoljubov, 3. Friedrich Sämisch, 4. Curt von Bardeleben
 1919 Berlin (Triangular) 1. Walter John, 2. Ehrhardt Post, 3. Bernhard Gregory
 1919 Troy 1. Abraham Kupchik, 2. Charles Jaffe, 3. Oscar Chajes, 4. Jacob Bernstein
 1919/20 Hastings 1. Frederick Yates, 2. Scott, 3. Henry Ernest Atkins, 4. Richard Griffith
 1920 Genova 1. Stefano Rosselli, 2. Davide Marotti, 3. Dolci, 4. Bernheimer
 1920 Utrecht 1. Géza Maróczy, 2. Savielly Tartakower, 3. Adolf Olland, 4. Gerard Oskam
 1920 Amsterdam 1. Max Euwe, 2. te Kolsté, 3. van Hoorn, 4. Max Marchand
 1920 Rotterdam 1. Akiba Rubinstein, 2–3. Samuel Factor, Abraham Speijer, 4. van Gelder
 1920 Łódź  1. Moshe Hirschbein, 2. Rosenbaum, 3. Gottesdiener, 4. Jakub Kolski
 1920 Vienna 1. Savielly Tartakower, 2. Ernst Grünfeld, 3. Géza Maróczy, 4. Benjamin Blumenfeld
 1921 Kiel 1. Efim Bogoljubov, 2–3. Alfred Brinckmann, Friedrich Sämisch, 4. Richard Réti
 1921 Hamburg 1. Heinrich Wagner, 2. Paul Krüger, 3. Wilhelm Schönmann, 4. Julius Dimer
 1921 New York 1–2. Frank Marshall, Forsberg, 3. Charles Jaffe, 4 Albert Hodges
 1921 Utrecht 1. Adolf Olland, 2. Willem Schelfhout, 3. Victor Kahn, 4. Piccardt
 1921 Triberg 1. Akiba Rubinstein, 2–3. Efim Bogoljubov, Rudolf Spielmann, 4. Alexey Selezniev
 1921 Baden-Baden 1. Dietrich Duhm, 2. Weissinger, 3. Sartori, 4. Andreas Duhm
 1922 Mannheim (Triangular) 1. Siegbert Tarrasch, 2. Paul Saladin Leonhardt, 3. Jacques Mieses
 1922 Paris (Triangular) 1. André Muffang, 2. Frédéric Lazard, 3. Amédée Gibaud
 1922 Scheveningen 1–2. Max Euwe, George Salto Fontein, 3–4. Rudolf Loman, Alexander Rueb
 1924 Berlin 1. Paul Johner, 2. Akiba Rubinstein, 3. Richard Teichmann, 4. Jacques Mieses
 1925 Amsterdam 1. Jacques Davidson, 2. Max Euwe, 3–4. Friedrich Sämisch, Henri Weenink
 1925 Bern 1. Alexander Alekhine, 2. Arnold Aurbach, 3. Oskar Naegeli, 4. Walter Michel
 1925 London (Triangular) 1. Akiba Rubinstein, 2–3. George Alan Thomas, Frederick Yates
 1925 Bromley: 1. Hermanis Matisons, 2. Karel Skalička, 3. Karel Hromádka, 4. Fricis Apšenieks
 1925 Wiesbaden 1. Max Euwe, 2. Rudolf Spielmann, 3. Georg Schories, 4. Friedrich Sämisch
 1925 Kolin 1. Richard Réti, 2–3. Karel Opočenský, Max Walter, 4. Formanek
 1925 Győr 1–2. Ferenc Chalupetzky, Győző Exner, 3. Horváth, 4. Galgóczy
 1925 Bucharest 1. Alexandru Tyroler, 2. Sigmund Herland, 3. Iosif Mendelssohn, 4. Stefan Erdélyi
 1925 Leningrad 1. Solomon Gotthilf, 2–3. Carlos Torre Repetto, Yakov Rokhlin, 4. Abram Model
 1926 Amsterdam 1. Edgard Colle, 2. Savielly Tartakower, 3. Max Euwe, 4. Pannekoek
 1927 Utrecht 1. Max Euwe, 2. Jacques Davidson, 3. Adolf Olland, 4. Arnold van Foreest
 1927 Warsaw 1. Stanisław Kohn, 2–3. Kazimierz Makarczyk, Savielly Tartakower, 4. Akiba Rubinstein
 1928 Hamburg 1. Heinrich Wagner, 2. Herbert Heinicke, 3. Wilhelm Schönmann, 4. Rodatz
 1928 Stockholm 1. Richard Réti, 2–3. Erik Lundin, Gösta Stoltz, 4. Gideon Ståhlberg
 1929 London 1. Frederick Yates, 2. William Winter, 3–4. Mir Sultan Khan, Adrián García Conde
 1929 Maastricht 1. Marcel Engelmann, 2. Victor Soultanbeieff, 3. Salo Landau, 4. Courtens
 1929 Ghent 1. Edgard Colle, 2. Georges Koltanowski, 3. Marcel Engelmann, 4. Varlin
 1929 Odessa (Triangular) 1. Boris Verlinsky, 2. Sergey von Freymann, 3. Ilya Kan
 1930 Rotterdam 1. Savielly Tartakower, 2–3. Daniël Noteboom, Sándor Takács, 4. Salo Landau
 1930 Berlin 1–2. Ludwig Rellstab, Friedrich Sämisch, 3. Carl Ahues, 4. Kurt Richter
 1930 Berlin 1. Isaac Kashdan, 2. Karl Helling, 3. Herman Steiner, 4. Friedrich Sämisch
 1930 Bucharest 1. Taubmann, 2. Abraham Baratz, 3. Iosif Mendelssohn, 4. Wechsler
 1930 Le Pont 1. Hans Johner, 2. Ossip Bernstein, 3. Oskar Naegeli, 4. Walter Michel
 1930 Liége 1. Victor Soultanbeieff, 2. Isaías Pleci, 3. Liubarski, 4. Mendlewicz
 1931 Amsterdam 1–2. Max Euwe, Salo Landau, 3. Daniël Noteboom, 4. Selman
 1931 Rotterdam 1. Salo Landau, 2. Edgard Colle, 3. Savielly Tartakower, 4. Akiba Rubinstein
 1932 Bern 1–3. Alexander Alekhine, Oskar Naegeli, Erwin Voellmy, 4. Fritz Gygli
 1933 Bern 1. Oskar Naegeli, 2. Salo Flohr, 3–4. Fritz Gygli, Hans Johner
 1933 Bremen 1–2. Carl Carls, Carl Ahues, 3. Heinrich Wagner, 4. Oskar Antze
 1933 Warsaw 1. Mieczysław Najdorf, 2. Paulin Frydman, 3. Leon Kremer, 4. Kazimierz Makarczyk
 1933 Moscow 1. Fedir Bohatyrchuk, 2. Boris Verlinsky, 3. Nikolai Riumin, 4. Peter Romanovsky
 1934 Rotterdam 1. Alexander Alekhine, 2. Salo Landau, 3. Muehring, 4. Hamming
 1935 Łódź  1. Izaak Appel, 2. Achilles Frydman, 3–4. Jakub Kolski, Edward Gerstenfeld
 1935 Łódź  1. Jakub Kolski, 2–3. Izaak Appel, Teodor Regedziński, 4. Achilles Frydman
 1935 Łódź  1. Savielly Tartakower, 2. Izaak Appel, 3. Teodor Regedziński, 4. Jakub Kolski
 1935 Göteborg 1. Gösta Danielsson, 2. Ernst Larsson, 3. Allan Nilsson, 4. John B. Lindberg
 1936 Amsterdam 1–2. Alexander Alekhine, Salo Landau, 3–4. Jongedijk, Koomen
 1936 Brussels 1–2. Jacques Mieses, Jerochov, 3. Albéric O'Kelly de Galway, 4. Jung
 1937 Bad Nauheim, Stuttgart, Garmisch 1. Max Euwe, 2–3. Efim Bogoljubov, Alexander Alekhine, 4. Friedrich Sämisch
 1937 Nice 1. Alexander Alekhine, 2. Barbato Rometti, 3. Victor Kahn, 4. Brian Reilly
 1937 Bremen 1. Efim Bogoljubov, 2–3. Friedrich Sämisch, Heinrich Reinhardt, 4. Carl Carls
 1937 Brussels 1. Albéric O'Kelly de Galway, 2. Movsas Feigins, 3. Paul Devos, 4. Emil Diemer
 1937 Riga 1. Paul List, 2. Movsas Feigins, 3. Fricis Apšenieks, 4. Teodors Bergs
 1937 Riga (Triangular) 1. Vladimirs Petrovs, 2. Fricis Apšenieks, 3. Movsas Feigins
 1937 Vienna 1. Paul Keres, 2. Wolfgang Weil, 3. Albert Becker, 4. David Podhorzer
 1937 Warsaw 1–4. Gideon Ståhlberg, Antoni Wojciechowski, Lajos Steiner, Mieczysław Najdorf
 1937 Zoppot 1. Ludwig Rellstab, 2. Gideon Ståhlberg, 3. Lajos Steiner, 4. Herbert Ludwigshausen
 1938 Bergedorf 1. Heinrich Reinhardt, 2–3. Efim Bogoljubov, Friedrich Sämisch, 4. Herbert Heinicke
 1938 Beverwijk 1. Philip Bakker, 2. van Dijk, 3. Zoontjes, 4. van den Bronk
 1938 Moscow 1–2. Ilya Kan, Viacheslav Ragozin, 3–4. Vladimir Alatortsev, Nikolai Riumin
 1939 Baarn (I) 1. Salo Flohr, 2. Haije Kramer, 3. László Szabó, 4. van Epen
 1939 Baarn (II) 1. Max Euwe, 2. George Salto Fontein, 3. Salo Landau, 4. Spanjaard
 1939 Beverwijk 1. Nicolaas Cortlever, 2. van Steenis, 3. Bakker, 4. van Dijk
 1939 Copenhagen (Triangular) 1. Holger Norman-Hansen, 2. Christian Poulsen, 3. Jens Enevoldsen
 1939 Buenos Aires (Triangular) 1. Carlos Maderna, 2. Luis Piazzini, 3. José Gerschman
 1940 Buenos Aires (Triangular) 1. Carlos Guimard, 2. Aristide Gromer, 3. Franciszek Sulik
 1940 Randers 1–2. Jens Enevoldsen, Christian Poulsen, 3–4. Bjørn Nielsen, Sørensen
 1940 Baarn 1. Salo Landau, 2–3. Max Euwe, Hans Kmoch, 4. Haije Kramer
 1940 Beverwijk 1. Max Euwe, 2. Hendrik Jan Van Steenis, 3. Nicolaas Cortlever, 4. Arthur Wijnans
 1940 Delft 1. Hans Kmoch, 2. Max Euwe, 3. Johannes van den Bosch, 4. Salo Landau
 1941 Beverwijk 1. Arthur Wijnans, 2. Nicolaas Cortlever, 3. Max Euwe, 4. Carel Sammelius
 1942 Rio de Janeiro 1. Duarte, 2. João de Souza Mendes, 3. Burlamaqui, 4. Moses.
 1943 Rio de Janeiro 1. Erich Eliskases, 2. Oswaldo Cruz Filho, 3. Walter Cruz, 4. João de Souza Mendes
 1951 Buenos Aires (Triangular) 1. Carlos Maderna, 2. Jacobo Bolbochán, 3. Heinrich Reinhardt
 1952 Sofia (Triangular) 1. Alexander Tsvetkov, 2. Milko Bobotsov, 3. Nikolay Minev
 1954 Vilnius 1. Vladas Mikėnas, 2. Ratmir Kholmov, 3–4. Isakas Vistaneckis, Viacheslav Ragozin
 1956 Leningrad (Triangular) 1. Mark Taimanov, 2. Yuri Averbakh, 3. Boris Spassky
 1957 Sofia (Triangular) 1. Oleg Neikirch, 2. Aleksandar Matanović, 3. Bogdan Śliwa
 1960 Madrid 1. Svetozar Gligorić, 2–3. Lajos Portisch, Arturo Pomar, 4. Jan Hein Donner
 1960 Buenos Aires (Triangular) 1. Samuel Schweber, 2. Heinrich Reinhardt, 3. Erich Eliskases
 1961 São Paulo (Triangular) 1. Eugênio German, 2. Rodrigo Flores, 3. Bernardo Wexler
 1962 Stockholm (Triangular) 1. Leonid Stein, 2. Pal Benko, 3. Svetozar Gligorić
 1963 Leningrad (Triangular) 1. Leonid Stein, 2. Boris Spassky, 3. Ratmir Kholmov
 1964 Rio de Janeiro (Triangular) 1. Oscar Quiñones, 2. Samuel Schweber, 3. Mauro de Athayde
 1967 Buenos Aires 1. Henrique Mecking, 2. Julio Bolbochán, 3. Oscar Panno, 4. Alberto Foguelman
 1973 Chicago (Triangular) 1. Robert Byrne, 2. Samuel Reshevsky, 3. Lubomir Kavalek
 1974 Buenos Aires (Triangular) 1. Jorge Szmetan, 2. Jorge Rubinetti, 3. Ricardo Grinberg
 1976 Manila 1. Eugenio Torre, 2. Anatoly Karpov, 3. Ljubomir Ljubojević, 4. Walter Browne
 1976 Amsterdam 1. Anatoly Karpov, 2. Walter Browne, 3–4. Jan Timman, Fridrik Olafsson
 1979 South Africa 1. Viktor Korchnoi, 2. Wolfgang Unzicker, 3. Tony Miles, 4. Anatoly Lein
 1979 Waddinxveen 1. Anatoly Karpov, 2. Lubomir Kavalek, 3. Vlastimil Hort, 4. Gennadi Sosonko
 1980 Puerto Madryn 1–2. Tony Miles, Ljubomir Ljubojević, 3. Oscar Panno, 4. Miguel Quinteros
 1981 Johannesburg 1. Ulf Andersson, 2–3. Viktor Korchnoi, Robert Hübner, 4. John Nunn
 1989 Santiago de Chile 1. Gilberto Milos, 2.-3. Ivan Morovic Fernandez, Oscar Panno 4. Roberto Cifuentes Parada
 1991 Rybinsk 1. Marat Makarov, 2–3. Vladimir Kramnik, Maxim Sorokin, 4. Andrei Kharlov
 1993 San Nicolas (Triangular) 1. Darcy Lima, 2. Gilberto Milos, 3. Daniel Cámpora
 1993 Chalkidiki, Afitos 1. Boris Gelfand, 2..-3. Michael Adams, Alexei Shirov, 4. Vassilios Kotronias
 2000 São Paulo 1. Rafael Leitão, 2. Giovanni Vescovi, 3. Jaime Sunye Neto, 4. Gilberto Milos
 2008 Reykjavik 1–2. Lajos Portisch, Vlastimil Hort, 3. Friðrik Ólafsson, 4. Pal Benkö
 2009 Bilbao 1. Levon Aronian, 2–3. Alexander Grischuk, Sergey Karjakin, 4. Alexei Shirov
 2010 Shanghai 1. Alexei Shirov, 2–3. Levon Aronian, Vladimir Kramnik, 4. Wang Hao
 2010 Bilbao 1. Vladimir Kramnik, 2. Viswanathan Anand, 3. Magnus Carlsen, 4. Alexei Shirov
 2010 Mexico City 1. Judit Polgár, 2. Veselin Topalov, 3. Vassily Ivanchuk, 4. Manuel León Hoyos

See also

Chess tournament
List of strong chess tournaments

References
Renaissance Players
La grande storia degli scacchi
Chessmetrics.com
Name Index to Jeremy Gaige's Chess Tournament Crosstables, An Electronic Edition, Anders Thulin, Malmö, 2004-09-01
Roger Paige's Chess Site
Berliner Schachverband Berlin Chess Federation
Dutchbase Founder & Archivist : Jack Goossens
Brasil Chess Base
Russian Chess Base

External links
Search chess tournaments around the world

Mini chess tournaments

de:Liste der bedeutendsten Schachturniere